Theodor Reimann (10 February 1921 – 30 August 1982), also known as Teodor Reimann, was a football goalkeeper and manager. At club level he played mostly for Slovan Bratislava. Internationally he played for both Slovakia and Czechoslovakia. He obtained 14 caps for Slovakia from 1939 to 1943. He obtained five caps between 1948 and 1954 for Czechoslovakia including one at the 1954 FIFA World Cup.

Club career
Reimann played for AC Považská Bystrica during wartime. He played for Slovan Bratislava for the majority of his career, winning three consecutive league titles with the club in 1949, 1950 and 1951. In the early 1950s Reimann set a record of not conceding a goal in the Czechoslovak First League for 769 minutes, a record that he held until Sparta Prague goalkeeper Petr Čech surpassed this mark in November 2001. In 1955 Reimann played for Tatran Prešov in a player-coach capacity, under which terms he continued at Iskra Žilina in 1956.

International career
Reimann represented two national teams; due to the separation of Czechoslovakia during World War II he was able to play for Slovakia between 1939 and 1943. He played fourteen times for Slovakia. After the war, the Slovakia team ceased to play matches and Reimann began to play for Czechoslovakia. Although he only made five appearances for Czechoslovakia, he did play in the 1954 FIFA World Cup, keeping goal in Czechoslovakia's 2–0 defeat against reigning World Cup champions Uruguay.

Coaching career
He coached MŠK Žilina, Lokomotíva Košice, FC Nitra, and Jednota Trenčín.

Honours

Club 
Slovan Bratislava
Czechoslovak First League (3): 1949, 1950, 1951

References

External links

1921 births
1982 deaths
Slovak footballers
Czechoslovak footballers
1954 FIFA World Cup players
Association football goalkeepers
Czechoslovakia international footballers
MŠK Žilina players
1. FC Tatran Prešov players
ŠK Slovan Bratislava players
Slovakia international footballers
Dual internationalists (football)
Slovak football managers
Czechoslovak football managers
MŠK Žilina managers
FC Nitra managers
1. FC Tatran Prešov managers
FC Lokomotíva Košice managers
People from Žilina District
Sportspeople from the Žilina Region